Fellay may refer to:
 Bernard Fellay (born 1958), Swiss bishop
 Raymond Fellay (1932–1994), Swiss skier